Hiroshima Sun Plaza (広島サンプラザ) is an arena in Hiroshima, Japan. With a capacity of 6,052, it is primarily used for indoor sports and concerts.  In addition, the annual Seijin shiki (the Japanese coming-of-age ceremony) is held there every January, sponsored by the Hiroshima City government.

Facilities
Hiroshima Sun Plaza Hall - Main hall
Sub hall - gymnasium
Banquet halls for Wedding ceremonies and Conferences
Accommodations
Restaurant

Access
Public transportation
from JR Shin-Inokuchi Station.
from Hiroden Shoko Center-iriguchi Station.
from Alpark Bus Terminal.
from Hiroshima Bus Center.

External links
Hiroshima Sun Plaza (Japanese)

Basketball venues in Japan
Indoor arenas in Japan
Sports venues in Hiroshima
Volleyball venues in Japan
Sports venues completed in 1985
1985 establishments in Japan